Gabriella Tucci (4 August 19299 July 2020) was an Italian operatic soprano who was particularly associated with the Italian repertory and performed at notable opera houses worldwide. She appeared at the Metropolitan Opera in 11 Verdi roles across 13 seasons, including Violetta in La traviata and Desdemona in Otello.

Life 
Born in Rome on 4 August 1929, Tucci trained at the Accademia di Santa Cecilia with Leonardo Filoni, whom she later married. She made her debut at the Teatro del Giglio in Lucca in 1951 as Verdi's La traviata. In 1952, she won the competition of Spoleto, and appeared at the Teatro Lirico Sperimentale as Leonora in Verdi's La forza del destino alongside Beniamino Gigli. She then took part in the famous revival of Cherubini's Medea, as Glauce opposite Maria Callas, at the Maggio Musicale Fiorentino in 1953.

She made her debut at La Scala in Milan in 1959 as Mimi in Puccini's La bohème, and her American debut the same year at the San Francisco Opera as Maddalena in Giordano's Andrea Chénier. The following year saw her debuts at both the Royal Opera House in London, as Puccini's Tosca, and the Metropolitan Opera in New York City, as his Madama Butterfly. In 260 appearances with the Met between 29 October 1960 and 25 December 1972, she was heard in twenty roles, including a record eleven of Verdi's: ranked in decreasing order of the number of times that she assumed them, they were Aida, Leonora in Il trovatore, Alice Ford in Falstaff, Marguerite in Gounod's Faust, Violetta in La Traviata, Cio-Cio-San in Madama Butterfly, Puccini's Tosca, Desdemona in Otello, Mimi in La Bohème, Euridice in Gluck's Orfeo ed Euridice, Puccini's Turandot, Leonora in La forza del destino, Elizabeth de Valois in Don Carlo, Gilda in Rigoletto, Maddalena in Andrea Chénier,  Donna Elvira in Mozart's Don Giovanni, Amelia in Simon Boccanegra, Amelia in Un ballo in maschera, Luisa Miller and Micaela in Bizet's Carmen. Her performance of the final trio from Faust with Nicolai Gedda and Jerome Hines was the penultimate item in the gala that concluded the Met's time in its first theatre on 16 April 1966. When she first appeared there as Mimi in 1964, partnered by Franco Corelli, a reviewer for The New York Times noted: "It was Miss Tucci's Mimi that gave the evening its warmest glow. The soprano does not have the most seductive of voices, butbarring a couple of off‐pitch notesshe put it to affecting use in many an exquisite phrase. Slim and lovely to look at, she created a whole character, now shy, now pathetic, now ecstatic, always believable."

Tucci also appeared at the Opera di Roma, Arena di Verona, Vienna State Opera, and in Berlin, Moscow, Tokyo and Buenos Aires. She traveled with the La Scala Opera to Moscow and Tokyo, participating in performances that have been documented in live recordings.

A versatile singer and an accomplished actress, Tucci was able to tackle a wide range of operas from the bel canto of Bellini's I puritani to verismo works. Her repertoire encompassed eighty roles in total, including in English, French, German and Russian.

Tucci made only two commercial recordings, Pagliacci in 1959, opposite Mario Del Monaco, and Il trovatore in 1964, opposite Franco Corelli, but she can be heard in a number of live performances, including in Cherubini's Medea and in Donizetti's Il Furioso al Isola di Santo Domingo.

Tucci also appeared in concert. In February 1968, she sang in performances of Verdi's Requiem, with George Szell conducting the Cleveland Orchestra and chorus, in what was described as "a vibrant quartet" with Janet Baker, Pierre Duval and Martti Talvela.

She died in Rome at age 90.

Discography

CDs 
 Verdi: Il trovatore, cond. Thomas Schippers, EMI
 Leoncavallo: Pagliacci (coupled with Mascagni's Cavalleria rusticana), cond. Francesco Molinari-Pradelli, Decca

DVDs 
 Leoncavallo: Pagliacci, cond. Giuseppe Morelli, VAI
 Verdi: Aida, cond. Franco Capuana, VAI
 Verdi: Otello, cond. Alberto Erede, VAI

References

Sources 
 The Metropolitan Opera Encyclopedia (Simon and Schuster, New York 1987). 
 Guide de l'opéra, Les indispensables de la musique (Fayard, 1995).

External links

 
 
 
 
 Gabriella Tucci, 90, Dies; Italian Soprano and Met Opera Mainstay nytimes.com, 17 July 2020
 Fallece Gabriella Tucci a los 90 años  (in Spanish) beckmesser.com, 12 July 2020
 

1929 births
2020 deaths
Italian operatic sopranos
Accademia Nazionale di Santa Cecilia alumni
Singers from Rome
20th-century Italian women opera  singers